Xanthocrambus caducellus is a species of moth in the family Crambidae. It is found in Spain, France, Switzerland and Italy.

References

Moths described in 1909
Crambinae
Moths of Europe